Three Forty Three is a Ranger 4200 class fireboat  that serves the New York City Fire Department as Marine Company 1.  Designed by Robert Allan Ltd. and built to replace the 1954 John D. McKean, it was commissioned at 0900 on September 11, 2010, exactly nine years after the 2001 terrorist attacks. It is one of four New York fireboats currently in active service.

Namesake
The boat's name comes from the number of FDNY members killed in the line of duty on September 11th, 2001.  For days following the terrorist attack the only water available to the area was provided by the FDNY's Marine Units.

Manufacturing
The Three Forty Three was built by Eastern Shipbuilding of Panama City, Florida, and is the largest single purpose fireboat built to date with the highest pumping capacity of any fireboat ever built. A sister vessel named Fire Fighter II was delivered and placed in service with Marine 9 in November 2010 to replace the 70-year-old Fire Fighter, which is listed on the National Register of Historic Places, and represented the city's first major investment in new fireboats in 50 years.

Features
The 140-foot, 500-ton, $27 million fast response boat is the country's largest fireboat, with a maximum speed of 18 knots. The Three Forty Three incorporates the latest technology available for marine vessels, including the capability of pumping 50,000 gallons of water per minute, nearly 30,000 gallons more than its predecessor. It has an operating crew of seven.

References 

Service vessels of the United States
Fireboats of New York City
2009 ships
Ships built in Panama City, Florida